Abby or Abbie is generally a nickname for the feminine given name Abigail, but can also be a given name in its own right. It may refer to:

People

Women
 Abbie Betinis (born 1980), American composer
 Abbie Boudreau (born 1979), American television news correspondent
 Abbie Farwell Brown (1871–1927), American author
 Abbie Brown (rugby union) (born 1996), British rugby sevens player
 Abbie Burgess (1839–1892), American lighthouse keeper
 Abbie Cornett (born 1966), American politician
 Abbie Cornish (born 1982), Australian actress and rapper
 Abby Dalton (1932–2020), American actress
 Abbie Eaton (born 1992), British racing driver
 Abby Ellin, American author and journalist
 Abby Elliott (born 1987), American actress and comedian
 Abby Erceg (born 1989), New Zealand footballer
 Abby Ershow, American nutritionist
 Abbie Huston Evans (1881–1983), American poet and teacher
 Abby Franquemont (born 1972), American textile crafts writer and lecturer
 Abbie Park Ferguson (1837–1919), American founder and president of Huguenot College in South Africa
 Abbie M. Gannett (1845–1895), American essayist, poet and philanthropist
 Abby and Brittany Hensel (born 1990), American conjoined twins
 Abby Hoffman (born 1947), Canadian former middle-distance runner
 Abigail Johnson (born 1961), American businesswoman
 Abby Johnson (activist) (born 1980), American anti-abortion activist
 Abby Kelley (1811–1887), American abolitionist and radical social reformer
 Abby Fisher Leavitt (1836–1897), American social reformer
 Abby Martin (born 1984), American journalist
 Abbie K. Mason (1861–1908) was a Black American suffragist.
 Abby Rockefeller Mauzé (1903–1976), American philanthropist, first child of Abby Rockefeller and John D. Rockefeller Jr.
 Abbie Mitchell (1884–1960), African-American operatic soprano
 Abbie Myers (born 1994), Australian tennis player
 Abby Ringquist (born 1989), American ski jumper
 Abby Aldrich Rockefeller (1874–1948), American socialite and philanthropist, wife of John D. Rockefeller Jr.
 Abby Rockefeller (ecologist) (born 1943), American ecologist and feminist
 Abby Stein (born 1991), American transgender activist and writer
 Abby Steiner (born 1999), American sprinter
 Abby Sunderland (born 1993), sailor who attempted to become the youngest person to circumnavigate the world
 Abby Taylor (born 1985), Tobago politician
 Abby Travis (born 1969), American musician
 Abby Trott, American voice actress
 Abby Wambach (born 1980), American retired soccer player and co

Men
 Albert Brunies (1900–1978), American jazz cornetist nicknamed "Abbie"
 Abbie Hoffman (1936–1989), American social and political activist
 Abbie Johnson (1871–1960), Canadian-born Major League Baseball player
 Abby Mann (1927–2008), American film writer and producer
 Abbie Shaba (born 1958), Malawian politician
 Abbie Shadbolt, New Zealand rugby league player
 Abby Singer (1917–2014), film production manager and assistant director from the 1950s to the 1980s
 Abbie Wolanow, Israeli-born American soccer player in the early 1960s

Fictional characters
 Abby (Doctor Who), in audio dramas based on the TV series Doctor Who
 Abigail "Abby" Anderson, character in the 2020 video game, The Last of Us Part II
 Abby Archer, main protagonist of the 2006 YTV animated program Grossology
 Abigail Van Buren, pen name used for the Dear Abby syndicated personal advice column
 Abigail "Abby" Cadabby, on the television show Sesame Street
 Abbie Carmichael, on the television show Law & Order, played by Angie Harmon
 Abby Davies, on the soap opera Hollyoaks
 Abby Deveraux, on the American soap opera Days of our Lives
 Abby Hatcher, main protagonist of the eponymous 2018 animated children's program produced by Guru Studio
 Abby Holland, a fictional comic book character who exists in the DC Universe
 Abby Lockhart, a medical doctor on the television series ER
 Abby Maitland, on the ITV science-fiction drama Primeval
 Abby Newman, on the American soap opera The Young and the Restless
 Abby Park, one of Meilin Lee's best friends from the 2022 Pixar film Turning Red
 Abby Sciuto, a forensic scientist on the television series NCIS
 Abigail "Abbie" Scrapple, in the American comic strip Abbie an' Slats (1937–1971)
 Abby the Cow, on the Nickelodeon animated series Back at the Barnyard
 The title character of Abby, a 2003 television series starring Sydney Tamiia Poitier
 The title character of Abby (film), a 1974 blaxploitation/horror film about a woman possessed by an African demon
 Abbie, a 12-year-old vampire in the film, Let Me In
 Abby, in the Disney movie Chicken Little
 Abby, one of many mutant creatures on the American TV series Wayward Pines

See also

English feminine given names
Hypocorisms
Lists of people by nickname